Dan the Dyna-Mite is a fictional character, a teen-aged superhero published by DC Comics. He was the young sidekick to the character TNT, and was created by Mort Weisinger and Hal Sharp in 1942. TNT and Dyna-Mite made their debut in Star Spangled Comics #7 and starred through #23.

Fictional character biography
Danny Dunbar was the star pupil of Thomas N. Thomas, a high school chemistry and physical education teacher.

One evening while Thomas and Dunbar are working on an experiment, Thomas' hand accidentally touches Dunbar's and both teacher and student find themselves feeling more energized. Thomas realizes that each of them has somehow absorbed the chemicals with which they have been working. By touching each other, Thomas and Dunbar now become charged with an unknown form of energy and briefly possess superhuman powers.

They decide not to reveal their discovery publicly for fear that it would be misused. Instead, they use their new super-powers to fight crime as costumed heroes. Thomas becomes known as TNT and Dunbar as Dan the Dyna-Mite, and both join the wartime All-Star Squadron. Thomas and Dunbar each wears a "dyna-ring". By pressing the rings together, Thomas and Dunbar trigger a chemical reaction that temporarily charges the two heroes with energy.

In April 1942, TNT and Dyna-Mite battle Nazi saboteurs who are attempting to blow up a dam in Colorado. When the saboteurs flee in a car, the pair gives chase in their own auto. One of the bullets hits the tire of the heroes' car and it crashes and bursts into flames. The young hero Iron Munro pulls TNT and Dyna-Mite from the wreckage. TNT is already dead, and his spirit is carried off by the Valkyrie called Gudra (a member of Axis Amerika). Munro takes Dyna-Mite to a hospital, where he soon recovers.

Danny is grief-stricken but bucks up when President Roosevelt requests that he and other young members of the All-Star Squadron take a cross-country tour to encourage the buying of war bonds. His depression is worsened by the assumption that without TNT, he can no longer use his own super-powers. Soon Danny learns he can activate them by wearing both dyna-rings and pressing them together.

In his "golden years", Dan joins his childhood friends Neptune Perkins, Doiby Dickles, Merry Pemberton and the Cyclone Kids (now called the Cyclones) to form "Old Justice". They were all once sidekicks to older superheroes. They advocate abolishing teen super-teams and butt heads with Young Justice many times. Over the course of the Sins of Youth storyline, a rally in D.C. over this issue occurs. It is attacked and dozens of adult superheroes turn young and the Young Justice members turn adult. Old Justice, unaffected, find themselves having to supervise the chaotic crowd of younger heroes with the aid of the now-adult Young Justice. Temporarily working out of the JLA HQ in Happy Harbor, everyone must deal with Klarion the Witch Boy, other younger supervillains, and dozens of magically created monsters. It comes down to every available hand in a vicious battle in the snowfields outside an Alaskan scientific complex. At the end of the adventure, once Klarion is blackmailed into restoring the altered heroes, Old Justice realizes Young Justice really are worthy heroes.

In 2010's DCU: Legacies #2, TNT and Dyna-Mite are revealed to have been founding members of the Seven Soldiers of Victory. How this retcon affects their histories, such as the previously established death of TNT and Dyna-Mite's Young All-Stars stint, has not yet been revealed.

During the "Dark Nights: Death Metal" storyline, Dan the Dyna-Mite is among the superheroes revived by Batman using a Black Lantern ring.

Powers and abilities
As with his mentor, he possessed a ring which controlled his powers, releasing them only when the two rings came into contact. Originally he wore only one of the rings, which gave him enhanced strength, speed and resistance to injury and energy generation. But after his mentor died, he discovered he could wear both rings and release the power by pressing both rings together himself.

Reception
American Comic Book Chronicles says that the TNT and Dan the Dyna-Mite series "had potential, but consistently fell flat, limited space and unimaginative writing its chief problems".

Dyno-Mite Dan
Functional forgeries of the rings were later bought online by a superhero wannabe who called himself Dyno-Mite Dan (Harris D. Ledbetter). He appeared only once, after joining the Vigilante's short-lived new Seven Soldiers of Victory. All members of this group were slaughtered by the Gods of the Miracle Mesa (the Sheeda).

Other versions
In the Elseworlds miniseries The Golden Age by James Robinson and Paul Smith, TNT is killed in an apparent accident during World War 2, and Daniel Dunbar becomes very depressed.  Approached by Tex Thompson, he volunteers for a government experiment (dropping an atomic bomb on him) which transforms him into the powerful Dynaman, who possesses vast superhuman strength, durability, and the power of flight. As Dynaman, Dunbar serves as a public face for Thompson's agenda, but in private becomes increasingly unhinged, taking narcotics and worshipping the Devil. It is revealed in the climax that the Ultra-Humanite, having placed himself in Thompson's body during the war, had removed Dunbar's brain and replaced it with that of Adolf Hitler before the experiment. Learning this, a group of heroes attempt to reveal Dynaman's identity on national television. This results in a battle across Washington, DC, with Dynaman killing and wounding several heroes, before being fatally impaled by Liberty Bell using Starman's cosmic rod.

References

DC Comics characters who can move at superhuman speeds
DC Comics characters with superhuman strength
DC Comics superheroes
DC Comics metahumans
DC Comics sidekicks
Characters created by Mort Weisinger
Comics characters introduced in 1942
Golden Age superheroes